The men's 89 kilograms competition at the 2021 World Weightlifting Championships was held on 12 and 13 December 2021.

Schedule

Medalists

Records

Results

References

Results

Men's 89 kg